Arthur Henry Wainwright (November 1894 – 18 January 1968) was an English professional footballer who played as a winger.

References

1894 births
1968 deaths
Footballers from Sheffield
English footballers
Association football wingers
Tinsley Working Mens Club F.C. players
Leeds City F.C. players
Grimsby Town F.C. players
Gresley F.C. players
Bristol Rovers F.C. players
Barrow A.F.C. players
Hednesford Town F.C. players
Walsall LMS F.C. players
Bloxwich Strollers F.C. players
Scarborough F.C. players
English Football League players